Caribbean Carnival is the term used in the English speaking world for a series of events, held annually throughout almost the whole year in many Caribbean islands and worldwide.

The Caribbean's carnivals have several common themes, all originating from Trinidad and Tobago Carnival also known as the Mother of Carnival , whose popularity and appeal began well before 1846, and gained global recognition in 1881 with the Canboulay Riots in Port Of Spain. #Trinidad Carnival is based on folklore, culture, religion, and tradition (thus relating to the European use of the word, not amusement rides, as the word "carnival" is often used to mean in American English. Carnival tradition is based on a number of disciplines including: Parade of the Bands /Carnival parade /"Playing Mas"/masquerade; calypso music; soca music and crowning a Calypso monarch aka Calypso King; Soca monarch aka Soca King; Panorama (steelpan/steelband competition);Old mas aka Traditional mas competition; J'ouvert celebrations inclusive of jab molassie / jab jab, Moko Jumbie Dame Lorraine Blue Devil; and a number of other Trinidad Carnival / Trinidadian traditions.

Local Caribbean Carnivals

Approximate dates are given for the concluding festivities. Carnival season may last for over a month prior to the concluding festivities, and the exact dates vary from year to year.

Anguilla — Anguilla Summer Festival, early August
Antigua and Barbuda
Antigua — Antigua Carnival, early August
Barbuda — Caribana, early June
Aruba — Carnival, February, Ash Wednesday
Barbados — Crop Over, early August
Bahamas - Bahamas Junkanoo Carnival, first week of May
Belize — Carnival, September
Bermuda — Bermuda Carnival (third weekend in June) https://www.bermudacarnival.com/
Bonaire — Carnival, February Ash Wednesday
British Virgin Islands
Tortola — BVI Emancipation (August) Festival, early August
Virgin Gorda — Virgin Gorda Easter Festival Celebrations, late March/early April
Canada
 Toronto  — Caribana Toronto Caribbean Carnival (early August)
 
Cayman Islands — Batabano, late April/early May
Cuba
Cuba — Carnival of Santiago de Cuba, July
Cuba — Havana Carnival, July/August
Curaçao — Carnival, February, Ash Wednesday
Dominica — Carnival, February, Ash Wednesday
Dominican Republic — Dominican Carnival, February, Dominican Independence Day
French Guiana — Carnival in French Guiana usually takes place between Epiphany and Ash Wednesday, ending on Mardi Gras.
Grenada
Carriacou — Carriacou Carnival, February, Ash Wednesday
Grenada — Spicemas, early August
Guadeloupe — Carnaval - February, Ash Wednesday
Guyana — Mashramani (Mash), February 23, Guyanese Republic Day
Guyana — Guyana Carnival, Mid-May,
Haiti — Kanaval, February, Ash Wednesday
Jamaica — Bacchanal, late March/early April
Martinique — Carnival, February, Ash Wednesday
Montserrat — Montserrat Festival, mid-December to early January, New Year's Day
Puerto Rico — Carnaval de Ponce, February, Ash Wednesday
Saba — Saba Summer Festival, late July/early August
Saint-Barthélemy — Carnival, February, Ash Wednesday
Saint Lucia — Carnival, July
Saint Kitts and Nevis
Saint Kitts — Carnival, December/January
Nevis — Culturama, late July/early August
Saint-Martin — Carnival, February, Ash Wednesday
Saint Vincent and the Grenadines — Vincy Mas, late June/early July
Saint Eustatius — Statia Carnival, late July/early August
Sint Maarten — Carnival, late April/early May
Trinidad and Tobago
Trinidad — Carnival, February, Ash Wednesday
Tobago — Tobago Carnival, February, Ash Wednesday
Turks and Caicos Islands — Junkanoo Jump Up, in January
United States Virgin Islands
Saint Croix — Crucian Carnival, late December/early January Three King's Day
Saint John — St. John Festival, June through July 3 & 4, V.I. Emancipation Day and U.S. Independence Day
Saint Thomas — V.I. Carnival, April through early May
Saba, Dutch Caribbean - carnival, late July to August.

International Caribbean Carnivals

Canada

 "Caribe-Expo" — In the city of Ottawa in Ontario, Canada.
 "Carifiesta" — In the city of Montreal in Quebec, Canada, typically 2–3 weeks before Toronto's carnival
 "Toronto Caribbean Carnival — In Toronto, Ontario, it draws close to a million visitors to the city.
 "Carnival"(cancelled) — In the city of Hamilton, 1 week after Toronto's Caribana.
 "Carifest" — In the city of Calgary in Alberta, Canada.
 "Cariwest" — Held annually the second week of August in Edmonton, Alberta, Canada, drawing more than 60,000 visitors a year. Cariwest boasts an amazing display of masqueraders in the main parade, and is a beautiful festival full of food and entertainment in the heart of downtown.
 Barrie's Caribfest (parade has been cancelled since 2011)
CariBridge Caribbean Carnival in Lethbridge Alberta brings a unique and diverse culture to southern Alberta and focuses on bringing Caribbean culture through food, music, dance, and art.

A unique attraction distinguishing this Caribbean event is its location.  This dynamic, exciting event features some of the best Canadian and international Caribbean performers in music, dance, costumes, and world drumming. Events are held from Friday to Sunday throughout every third weekend of August.  The Grand Parade in Toronto is held on the first Saturday of August to commemorate the abolition of the slave trade on August 1, 1838.

France

 Carnaval Antillais de Colombes — every year late June.
 Carnaval Tropical de Paris — every year early July.
 Carnaval de Montpellier — every year in February. 
 Carnaval of French West Indies, about two months between the Sunday of Epiphany and Ash Wednesday

Germany
 Berlin — Karneval der Kulturen (Carnival of Cultures), every year in May (Whitsuntide weekend)

The Netherlands
 Rotterdam — "Summer Carnival" Zomercarnaval: occurs every year in July. Each year there are more than 800.000 visitors.

United Kingdom

 Birmingham — Birmingham International Carnival, Birmingham
 Leicester — Leicester Caribbean Carnival, at Victoria Park, Leicester
 London — Notting Hill Carnival, in Ladbroke Grove, West London; the largest open outdoor event in Europe
 Leeds — Leeds West Indian Carnival, sometimes called Chapeltown Carnival in Leeds; the oldest West Indian Carnival in Europe
 Manchester — Manchester Caribbean Carnival; the second-oldest Caribbean Carnival in the country, in Alexandra Park, Manchester
 Nottingham - Nottingham Caribbean Carnival, at Victoria Embankment in Nottingham
 Bristol — St Pauls Carnival in Bristol
 Preston — Preston Caribbean Carnival in Preston, Lancashire
 Derby - Derby Caribbean Carnival, at Osmanston Park, Derby

United States
 Atlanta Carnival Atlanta, Georgia — Last weekend in May, usually falls on Memorial Day weekend
 Austin, Texas — Carnaval Brasileiro, February 3
 Austin, Texas — Austin Summer Carnival, September 26 (FALL EQUINOX) End of Summer Celebration, Last weekend of Summer 
 Baltimore, Maryland — Baltimore Caribbean-American Festival held every July in Clifton Park neighborhood in Baltimore.
 Boston, Massachusetts — last Saturday in August, Dorchester, Massachusetts
 Cambridge, Massachusetts — Cambridge Carnival International, Sunday following Labor Day — Held in Kendall Square
 Chicago, Illinois — Windy City Carnival formerly Chicago CARIFETE, third Saturday in August, on the Midway Plaisance in the confines of the University of Chicago Campus. (http://windycitycarnival.com/)
  Dallas Carnival - Typically held the 3rd weekend in September. 
 Miami Broward Caribbean Carnival  Miami, FL — the second weekend in October, Columbus Day weekend.
Hartford, CT - Established in 1962, the West Indian Independence Celebration carnival parade and free concert takes place the second week of August in downtown Hartford.
 Houston, Texas — usually the weekend around Fourth of July. For 2017, the Ultimate Mega Fest (UMF) kicks off the Houston Caribbean festival season with soca, reggae, chutney, and Latin music.
 Jersey City, New Jersey — the fourth Saturday of July from Lincoln Park (Jersey City) parade route leading to the Festival at Exchange Place.
 Las Vegas, Nevada — Las Vegas Latin Caribfest —last weekend in October (www.lvcaribfest.com)
 Long Island, New York — weekend after Labor Day Carnival — Held in Hempstead
 Los Angeles, California — Hollywood Carnival, Parade of the Bands, fourth weekend of June.
 Madison, Wisconsin — Handphibians Carnaval!, Every year close to Brazilian Carnaval.  February 24/25 in 2017. http://www.madisoncarnaval.com/
 Minneapolis, Minnesota — CARIFEST — usually held the fourth weekend of July along West River Road right next to the Mississippi River. (www.Carifest.org)

 New Orleans, Louisiana — in November, the bayou Bacchanal is held on the first Saturday in downtown and Armstrong Park.
 New Orleans, Louisiana — The last full weekend of June, the NOLA Caribbean Festival host 7 events in 4 days including pre-parties, pool-parties, parades, and a Caribbean festival with music, food and crafts from all over the Caribbean.
 New Orleans, Louisiana — The last full weekend of June, the New Orleans Caribbean Carnival usually held in conjunction with the New Orleans Caribbean Experience, host a series of parties 4 events, 3 days in celebration of the New Orleans Caribbean Carnival 2021!!
 New York, New York — Labor Day Carnival — held in Brooklyn, along Eastern Parkway, with over 2.3 million visitors annually
 Philadelphia, Pennsylvania Held on Father's day weekend in the historic Fairmount Park.
 Orlando, Florida — usually held the last weekend in May, which is typically Memorial Day weekend. Most recently been held at the Citrus Bowl.
 Raleigh/Durham, North Carolina CaribMask  usually held on the third Saturday in August.
 San Francisco, California —  Carnaval San Francisco — last weekend in May, usually falls on Memorial Day weekend
 Seattle, Washington — Pioneer Square, annual Fat Tuesday celebration.
 Tacoma, Washington — PLU campus Carnival, near Fat Tuesday
 Tampa, Florida — usually held the beginning of June in St. Petersburg, Florida (Greater Tampa Bay Area) at Vinoy Park. Recently moved for 2011 to Raymond James Stadium.
 Norfolk, Virginia — Virginia CaribFest,(2nd weekend in July)
 Washington, D.C. — DC Caribbean Festival, usually between June 16–24 every year.
 Worcester, Massachusetts — Worcester Caribbean American Carnival, The day after Boston, MA Carnival.
 Charleston Carifest, Charleston, South Carolina — usually after Spoleto around the third weekend in June. This Carnival celebration is held in honour of Caribbean American Heritage Month.

See also
 Antigua Carnival
 Toronto Caribbean Carnival
 CARIFESTA
 Carnival Road March
 J'ouvert
 List of calypso musicians
 List of chutney musicians
 List of islands in the Caribbean
 Mardi Gras
 Trinidad Carnival
 Charleston Carifest

References

External links
Toronto Caribbean Carnival
 Caribbean Carnivals database
 Carnival Info
 Information about Moko Jumbies and a USA band
 Miami Carnival's Official Site
 Broward County In South Florida's Carnival Site
 Caribbean Carnaval Official Site
 Carnaval Tropical de Paris
 Caribbean Choice Carnival Connection
 Las Vegas Latin Caribbean Festival Official Site
 Charleston Carifest

Music festivals in the Caribbean
Calypso music
Soca music
Zouk
Carnivals in North America
Carnivals in Anguilla
Carnivals in Antigua and Barbuda
Carnivals in Aruba
Carnivals in the Bahamas
Carnivals in Barbados
Carnivals in Belize
Carnivals in Bonaire
Carnivals in the British Virgin Islands
Carnivals in the Cayman Islands
Carnivals in Cuba
Carnivals in Curaçao
Carnivals in Dominica
Carnivals in the Dominican Republic
Carnivals in Grenada
Carnivals in Guadeloupe
Carnivals in Guyana
Carnivals in Haiti
Carnivals in Jamaica
Carnivals in Martinique
Carnivals in Montserrat
Carnivals in Puerto Rico
Carnivals in Saba (island)
Carnivals in Saint Barthélemy
Carnivals in Saint Lucia
Carnivals in Saint Kitts and Nevis
Carnivals in Saint Martin
Carnivals in Saint Vincent and the Grenadines
Carnivals in Saint Eustatius
Carnivals in Sint Maarten
Carnivals in Trinidad and Tobago
Carnivals in the Turks and Caicos Islands
Carnivals in the United States Virgin Islands
Carnivals in the United States